Ernst Hermann Joseph Münch (October 25, 1798 – June 9, 1841) was a distinguished Roman Catholic historian of Germany.

He was born at Rheinfelden, October 25, 1798. He studied at Freiburg, was in 1819 teacher at Aarau, in 1824 professor at Freiburg, in 1828 professor of Church history and canon law at Liege. In 1831 he accepted a call to Stuttgart as librarian to the king, and died June 9, 1841.

He published, Die Heerzuge des christlichen Europa wider die Osmanen (Basle, 1822–26, 5 volumes): — Franz von Sickingen's Thaten (Stuttgart, 1827–29, 3 volumes): — Sammlung aller alteren und neueren Konkordate (1830–31, 2 volumes): — Geschichte des Monchthums (1828, 2 volumes): — Allgemeine Geschichte der katholischen Kirche (1838): — Romische Zustande und katholische Kirchenfragen (eod.): — Denkwurdigkeiten zur politischen Reformations und Sittengeschichte, etc. (1839): — Allgemeine Geschichte der neuesten Zeit (1833–35, 6 volumes). See Winer, Handbuch der theol. Lit. 1:696, 701, 747; Zuchold, Bibl. Theol. 2:920; especially the author's Erinnerungen und Studien aus den ersten 37 Jahren eines deutschen Gelehrten (Carlsruhe, 1836–38, 3 volumes). (B.P.)

1798 births
1841 deaths
German librarians